The 16533 / 16534 Jodhpur–Bangalore City Express is an Express train belonging to Indian Railways South Western Railway zone that runs between  and  in India.

It operates as train number 16533 from Jodhpur Junction to Bangalore City and as train number 16534 in the reverse direction, serving the states of Rajasthan, Gujarat, Maharashtra, Andhra Pradesh & Karnataka.

Coach composition

The train has LHB rakes with a max speed of 130 kmph. The train consists of 26 coaches:

 1 AC First Class
 3 AC II Tier
 4 AC III Tier
 11 Sleeper coaches
 1 Pantry Car
 4 General Unreserved
 2 Seating cum Luggage Rake

As is customary with most train services in India, coach composition may be amended at the discretion of Indian Railways depending on demand.

Service

Routing

Schedule

Rake sharing 

The train shares its rake with; 
 16573/16574 Yesvantpur–Puducherry Weekly Express, 
 16507/16508 Jodhpur–Bangalore City Express (via Hubballi), 
 16505/16506 Gandhidham–Bangalore City Express, 
 16531/16532 Ajmer–Bangalore City Garib Nawaz Express.

Traction

As the route is going to electrification, a Hubli-based WDP-4D diesel locomotive pulls the train to its destination.

References

External links
16533/Jodhpur–Bangalore City Express at India Rail Info
16534/Bangalore City–Jodhpur Express at India Rail Info

Express trains in India
Transport in Jodhpur
Rail transport in Rajasthan
Rail transport in Gujarat
Rail transport in Maharashtra
Rail transport in Andhra Pradesh
Transport in Bangalore
Rail transport in Karnataka